Łukasz Poręba (born 13 March 2000) is a Polish professional footballer who plays as a midfielder for Ligue 1 club Lens.

Club career
On 1 July 2022, Poręba joined French side RC Lens on a free transfer, signing a five-year contract. He made his first appearance with Lens in a friendly game against Rodez in July 2023. On 31 August 2023, he delivered an assist for his first Ligue 1 game against Lorient.

References

2000 births
Living people
People from Legnica
Polish footballers
Association football midfielders
Poland youth international footballers
Poland under-21 international footballers
Ekstraklasa players
III liga players
Ligue 1 players
Zagłębie Lubin players
RC Lens players
Polish expatriate footballers
Polish expatriate sportspeople in France
Expatriate footballers in France